Michael John Burns (born 4 October 1988) is an English footballer. He played in the English Football League for Carlisle United and as a youth player was twice a winner of the FA Youth Cup with Liverpool.

Club career

Early career
He was previously a player with Liverpool winning the FA Youth Cup twice in 2006 and 2007. He later joined Bolton Wanderers in the summer of 2007, having been signed by Sammy Lee. He made regular appearances for the reserves whilst at Bolton's academy.

Carlisle United
He went on trial to Gillingham in the summer of 2008 before going on trial with Carlisle United. In January 2009 he joined Carlisle, signing an eighteen-month contract. He then made his Carlisle debut on 10 February 2009 in the Football League One clash with Walsall.

On 21 January 2010 he joined Stafford Rangers on loan for a month, which was then extended for a second month. He appeared in all 11 games for the club during his loan period.

Newport County
In January 2011 Burns joined Newport County.

Guiseley
In June 2011 he joined Guiseley.

Vauxhall Motors
In June 2012 he joined Vauxhall Motors.

Return to Guiseley
In August 2013 he returned to Guiseley but left the club just two weeks later.

Gap Connah's Quay
In January 2014 he signed for Welsh Premier League team Gap Connah's Quay.

Widnes
After time out of football, in July 2017 he joined Widnes.

In 2019 he joined Parklands FC.

Family life

Micheal married 33 year old Hannah Burns and has three children, Riley Micheal Burns, Maisy Olivia Burns, and Esmae Lilly Burns.

International career
Burns represented England schoolboy and at Under-16 levels. He scored on his Under-16 debut in a 4-2 victory over Wales.

Honours
Liverpool
FA Youth Cup: Winner 2007
FA Youth Cup: Winner 2006

References

External links

1988 births
Living people
People from Huyton
English footballers
Association football midfielders
Carlisle United F.C. players
Stafford Rangers F.C. players
English Football League players
Newport County A.F.C. players
Vauxhall Motors F.C. players
Guiseley A.F.C. players
Cymru Premier players
Connah's Quay Nomads F.C. players
Widnes F.C. players